Perumpetty is a village under Mallappally Taluk in Pathanamthitta district, in the state of Kerala, India.

Demographics
 India census, Perumpetty had a population of 14581 with 6978 males and 7603 females.  Rubber plantations are a major source of income for the local population.

Places under Perumpetty Village 

1) Chalappally
2) Vrindavanam
3) Valiyakunnam - to be confirmed
4) Vellayil
5) Kottanadu
6) Athiyal
7) Chettiyarmukku
8) Puthukudimukku
9) Kariyamplavu
10) Pothrayilkulam
11) Arayalumkal
12) Methanam
13) Madathumchal
14) Kandanperoor
15) Kakkamala
16) Thaliyanickel
17) Puthoormukku
18) Chuttumon
19) Perumpetty
20) Atyal

Hospitals 

 GOVT. Homeo hospital vellayil
 Govt. Hospital - Madathumchal
 Ayurveda Hospital Chalappally

Schools 

 LPS valiyakunnam
 Govt. LP School Perumpetty
 MTLPS - Athiyal Bridge Junction, Perumpetty
 MTUPS - Athiyal Marthoma Church Junction, Perumpetty
 NSS High School - Chalappally
 Govt. LPS, Chalappally
 NSS UPS, Madathumchal
 NMHSS Kariyamplavu

Places of worship

Temples 

 Sree Mahadeva-Vishnu Temple
 Annapoorneswary Temple - Kunnam
 Pranamalakkavu Devi Temple - Kottanadu

Churches 
 St Marys Malankara catholic church kumblamthanam
 Athiyal Salem Marthoma Church - Athiyal,  Perumpetty
 CSI Church, Athiyal, Perumpetty 
 IPC Church, Athiyal, Perumpetty
 Ceylon Pentecostal
 Salvation Army
 St. Mary's  Orthodox Church  Perumpetty
 Jerusalem Marthoma Church, Pussanatu
 World Mission Evangelism church Athiyal
 Trinity MarThoma Church, Kottanadu

Masjid 

 Chettiyarmukku

Festivals 

 Sivarathri - Sree Mahadeva-Vishnu Temple
 Pooram - Annapoorneswary Temple
 Pranamalakkavu Temple festival

Nearest Railway Stn 

 Thiruvalla

References

Villages in Pathanamthitta district